The Chisholm Trail Parkway is a toll road operated by the North Texas Tollway Authority (NTTA) in Tarrant and Johnson counties connecting the central business district of the city of Fort Worth at Interstate 30 to US 67 in Cleburne.

Environmental clearance for the project was received in June 2005. Initial construction began in April 2010. Chisholm Trail Parkway opened to traffic on May 11, 2014. The cost of the parkway was approximately $1.4 billion.

The segment of the parkway from FM 1187 to I-30 in Tarrant County was originally named Southwest Parkway. Legislation renaming that segment was passed in May 2011.

Route description
The tollway starts at an interchange with US 67 in northern Cleburne, near SH 171. The first main lane toll gantry is between Sparks Road and Johnson County Road 904. At the interchange with FM 917 the tollway enters the southwestern tip of Burleson, near Joshua. FM 1902 runs parallel to the tollway from here to FM 1187. Just north of Johnson County Road 920, the Chisholm Trail Parkway crosses into Tarrant County. The interchange with FM 1187 is just to the west of Crowley. The second main lane toll gantry is near Stewart Feltz Road. Near Benbrook, the tollway has a complex stack interchange with I-20 and SH 183. The third and final main lane toll gantry is just before the University Drive exit. The Chisholm Trail Parkway ends at an interchange with I-30 near University Drive and Vickery Boulevard in Fort Worth, near TCU.

History
The Chisholm Trail Parkway was built as a collaboration between NTTA, TxDOT, NCTCOG, the cities of Cleburne, Burleson, and Fort Worth, and the Fort Worth & Western and Union Pacific Railroads.

About halfway between Fort Worth and Cleburne, a mixed use development is planned to be built along the corridor. Chisholm Trail Ranch will feature a movie theater and several restaurants, as well as residential areas. As part of the tollway's initial plans, Old Granbury Road was closed permanently on October 7, 2013, where it crosses the toll road and ends at a cul-de-sac.

The toll road was built in stages from 2008 to early 2014. Unlike many toll roads in North Texas, the entire length of the highway opened all at once, although the portion south of FM 1187 is initially a two-lane road.

The City of Fort Worth Public Art program cooperated with the parkway to add ten monumental glass and stone columnar “Watershed Crossing Markers” in the first eight and a half miles within the Fort Worth city limits, heading north, and twelve "Trinity Water Fowls" murals on the six monuments of the East Clearfork crossing bridge. The columns and monument murals, created by public artist Norie Sato, feature mosaics showing wildlife of the Trinity River watershed, utilizing images from local photographers.

Most of the CTP in Fort Worth north of Interstate 20 had an unusually low speed limit of 50 MPH when it first opened to traffic in 2014. The low speed limit was enacted by the city of Fort Worth to minimize the noise levels of passing traffic as the tollway passed through or near older neighborhoods. On September 1, 2016, the speed limit on the tollway between University Drive and Arborlawn Drive was raised from 50 MPH to 60  with the section between Arborlawn and Alta Mesa Boulevard being raised from 60 to 65.

Tolls 
As of August 2020, it costs a two-axle passenger vehicle $8.70 in cash to drive the entire length of the toll road in either direction. Two-axle vehicles paying with TollTag are only charged $5.79 for the same trip.

Exit list

References

External links

North Texas Tollway Authority
North Texas Tollway Authority - Chisholm Trail Parkway

Toll roads in Texas
Transportation in Fort Worth, Texas
Transportation in Tarrant County, Texas
Transportation in Johnson County, Texas
Two-lane freeways in the United States